Mali Iđoš is a village and municipality located in the North Bačka District of the autonomous province Vojvodina, Serbia. The municipality comprises three local communities and has a population of 12,031, of whom 6,486 (53.91%) are ethnic Hungarians, 2,388 are Serbs (19.85%) and 1,956 are Montenegrins (16.26%). Mali Iđoš village has a population of 4,830.

Name
The first part of the name of the village, "mali" ("little" in English), was given in contrast to the village with similar name (Iđoš), which is situated in northern Banat. The etymology goes back to the Hungarian name, 'Kishegyes', consisting of 'kis' (little) and 'hegyes' (mountainy [place]).

Inhabited places

Mali Iđoš municipality includes the following villages:
Mali Iđoš
Lovćenac 
Feketić

Demographics

According to the 2011 census results, the municipality of Mali Iđoš has a population of 12,031 inhabitants.

Ethnic groups

Local communities with a Hungarian majority are Mali Iđoš and Feketić. There is one local community with a Montenegrin majority: Lovćenac.

The ethnic composition of the municipality:

History
The name of Kishegyes was first mentioned in historical documents in 1476, without naming the shire, when the estates of the Maróthi family in the region of the Tisza river were counted. On 16 February 1462 Matthias Corvinus gave the settlements listed in the document as a present to his mother, Erzsébet Szilágyi. The destruction of the village started in 1514. The riot of György Dózsa required not only material damages, demolitions, driving away of cattle, but also a huge number of human victims. All this was followed by the defeat of Mohács. After the battle, the victor, the general of sultan Suleiman the Magnificent withdrew between the Danube and the Tisza rivers. The institutional Turkish subjection started after the fall of Buda, in 1541. The village became totally destroyed under Turkish occupation in the 16th century. The later Turkish tax assessment registers mention Kishegyes in the nahije of Szabadka with 18 houses to pay taxes in 1580–82 and 1590–91, and 17 in Nagyhegyes in 1580 and 23 houses in 1590. In 1652 the inhabitants of Hegyes paid taxes to Ferenc Wesselényi.  It was repopulated in 1769 by 81 Roman Catholic Hungarian families from Békésszentandrás. During the Hungarian Revolution of 1848 in Battle of Hegyes, the Hungarian soldiers gained a victory in Kishegyes on 14 July 1849. The region is extremely well suited for agriculture and the village increased in wealth and population until the 1980s. In the 1990s the local economy was ruined and young people began to emigrate to Hungary. Today the rate of unemployment is appr. 30 percent, and the Agricultural Cooperative and the Commercial Company went bankrupt. After the end of the civil war in Croatia and Bosnia (1995–96) Serbian refugees arrived to Mali Iđoš (Kishegyes). There are no ethnic tensions between native Hungarians and the Serbian refugees.

Sights
The oldest building in Mali Iđoš is the baroque Roman Catholic Church of St. Anne (1788) on the Main Street. There is an old Calvary, the obelisk of the Battle of Hegyes and the ruins of the Pecze Mansion. The natural attractions are the River Krivaja and the imposing loessal walls of the Hills of Telečka.

Notable people
 The Hungarian singer Magdolna Rúzsa grew up in Mali Iđoš. She won Megasztár, Hungary's version of Pop Idol in 2006 and represented Hungary at the Eurovision Song Contest 2007 in Helsinki, Finland.
 Ištvan Dudaš is a former Serbian professional footballer, who currently works as Goalkeeper coach for R.O.C. de Charleroi-Marchienne.

International relations

Twin towns – sister cities
Mali Iđoš is twinned with:
 Bar, Montenegro
 Cetinje, Montenegro
 Gádoros, Hungary
 Sokobanja, Serbia
 Solnechnogorsk, Russia

See also
List of Hungarian communities in Vojvodina
List of places in Serbia
List of cities, towns and villages in Vojvodina

References

Other sources
 Slobodan Ćurčić, Broj stanovnika Vojvodine, Novi Sad, 1996. OCLC ocm39963150

External links

 History of Mali Iđoš 
 Non-official website

 
Places in Bačka
Populated places in Vojvodina
Municipalities and cities of Vojvodina
Hungarian communities in Serbia